Pacific Audio Visual Institute (PAVI) was a private educational institution that specializes in music production and music management located in Vancouver, British Columbia, Canada. PAVI offers one-year diploma programs in Audio Engineering & Production and Music Business Management. PAVI differs from other institutions in that classes are taught within an operating, full-service, professional studio complex. Pacific Audio Visual Institute is accredited by the Private Career Training Institutions Agency of British Columbia. PAVI has recently been Awarded British Columbia’s Education Quality Assurance Designation. The EQA helps identify which provincial post-secondary institutions have met government assurance standards and offer consumer protection. Each year PAVI awards more than $100,000 in scholarships. Students have the opportunity to gain practical experience in their industry through PAVI's internship placement program. The school offers assistance and resources for International Students.  
with Citizenship and Immigration Canada.

Programs

Audio Engineering & Production
The Audio Engineering & Production (AEP) program offers provides hands-on training in music production and sound engineering. Students learn in a commercial recording studio with professional audio engineers and instructors who have active careers in the industry. Courses include Recording, Overdubbing, Mixing, Record Production, Electronic Music, Digital Audio Workstation, Audio for Video, Live Sound, Studio Design, Digital Signal Processing and Career Management.

Music Business Management
Music Business Management (MBM) program provides the education necessary for a business career in the entertainment industry. Students learn hands-on with industry professionals. Courses include Marketing & Promotion, Independent Label, Artist Development and Management, Industry Contracts, Record Production, Music Publishing, Social Media Management.  This program also offers a Music Video course and students have full access to the school's film gear for their own projects.

Film and Digital Arts
Program shuttered prematurely in 2012.

References

External links
Pacific Audio Visual Institute home page
PAVI Grads Speak Out
PAVI Campus News
Facebook page
Twitter page
School Reviews
PAVI Grads Get Jobs!
Post-Graduation Work Permit Program in British Columbia

Schools in Vancouver
Audio engineering schools